Disporella is a genus of bryozoans belonging to the family Lichenoporidae.

The genus has cosmopolitan distribution.

Species:

Disporella alaskensis 
Disporella alboranensis 
Disporella algoensis 
Disporella anhaltina 
Disporella astraea 
Disporella borgi 
Disporella boutani 
Disporella brasiliana 
Disporella bullata 
Disporella buski 
Disporella buskiana 
Disporella calcitrapa 
Disporella californica 
Disporella canaliculata 
Disporella capillata 
Disporella clypeiformis 
Disporella complicata 
Disporella composita 
Disporella compta 
Disporella confluens 
Disporella cookae 
Disporella coronula 
Disporella crassa 
Disporella crassiuscula 
Disporella cristata 
Disporella deformis 
Disporella densiporoides 
Disporella ezoensis 
Disporella fimbriata 
Disporella goldfussi 
Disporella grignonensis 
Disporella harmeri 
Disporella hispida 
Disporella humilis 
Disporella imperialis 
Disporella infundibuliformis 
Disporella julesi 
Disporella laticosta 
Disporella marambioensis 
Disporella minicamera 
Disporella minima 
Disporella minutissima 
Disporella mosquensis 
Disporella novaehollandiae 
Disporella octoradiata 
Disporella osburni 
Disporella ovoidea 
Disporella pattersonae 
Disporella phaohoa 
Disporella pila 
Disporella piramidata 
Disporella plumosa 
Disporella porosa 
Disporella pristis 
Disporella radiata 
Disporella robusta 
Disporella sacculus 
Disporella sagamiensis 
Disporella separata 
Disporella smitti 
Disporella spinulosa 
Disporella stellata 
Disporella tridentata 
Disporella truncata 
Disporella umbellata
Disporella verrucosa 
Disporella violacea 
Disporella wanganuiensis 
Disporella xianqiureni 
Disporella zurigneae

References

Bryozoan genera